The 2015 Vodacom Cup was contested from 6 March to 30 May 2015.

Competition rules and information

Sixteen teams participated in the 2015 Vodacom Cup competition. These teams were geographically divided into two sections, with eight teams in each of the Northern and Southern Sections. Teams played all the teams in their section once over the course of the season, either at home or away. At the request of the Namibia Rugby Union, all the ' matches were played in Windhoek.

Teams received four log points for a win and two points for a draw. Bonus log points were awarded to teams that scored four or more tries in a game, as well as to teams that lost a match by seven points or less. Teams were ranked by log points, then points difference (points scored less points conceded).

The top four teams in each section qualified for the title play-offs. In the quarter finals, the teams that finished first in each section had home advantage against the teams that finished fourth in the other section and the teams that finished second in each section had home advantage against the teams that finished third in the other section. The winners of these quarter finals then played each other in the semi-finals, with the higher-placed team having home advantage. The two semi-final winners then met in the final.

Quotas

This competition saw the retention of the quota system used in 2014. Each match-day squad had to contain seven black players. Two of these had to be forwards and five of these had to be in the starting line-up.

Teams

Changes from 2014

In September 2014, the Namibia Rugby Union revealed that they were in talks with the South African Rugby Union to enter the competition for the first time since 2011. Namibia's participation was confirmed on 19 November 2014 and it was later revealed that their new sponsor, First National Bank, agreed to a three-year sponsorship deal which should ensure their participation in the competition until 2017.

In addition, the Kenya Rugby Football Union also initially indicated that they intended to once again enter a team in the competition. However, after being included in the fixture list for the competition, the Kenyan RFU withdrew from the competition a month before its scheduled start date due to financial considerations. As a result,  moved to the Southern Section of the competition, inheriting the Simba XV's fixtures.

Team Listing

The following teams took part in the 2015 Vodacom Cup competition:

Logs

Round-by-round

The table below shows each team's progression throughout the season. For each round, their cumulative points total is shown with the overall log position in brackets:

Results

The following matches were played in the 2015 Vodacom Cup:

All times are South African (GMT+2).

Northern Section

Round one

Round two

Round three

Round four

Round Five

Round Six

Round Seven

Round Eight

Round Nine

Southern Section

Round one

Round two

Round three

Round four

Round Five

Round Six

Round Seven

Quarter-finals

Semi-finals

Final

Honours

The honour roll for the 2015 Vodacom Cup was as follows:

Players

Player statistics

The following table contain points which were scored in the 2015 Vodacom Cup:

Discipline

The following table contains all the cards handed out during the tournament:

Referees

The following referees officiated matches in the 2015 Vodacom Cup:

 Rodney Boneparte
 Ben Crouse
 Stephan Geldenhuys
 Quinton Immelman
 AJ Jacobs
 Cwengile Jadezweni
 Jason Jaftha
 Jaco Kotze
 Pro Legoete
 Lloyd Linton
 Tahla Ntshakaza
 Francois Pretorius
 Jaco Pretorius
 Oregopotse Rametsi
 Archie Sehlako
 Ricus van der Hoven
 Lourens van der Merwe
 Kurt Weaver

See also
 2015 Currie Cup Premier Division
 2015 Currie Cup qualification
 2015 Currie Cup First Division
 2015 Under-21 Provincial Championship Group A
 2015 Under-21 Provincial Championship Group B
 2015 Under-19 Provincial Championship Group A
 2015 Under-19 Provincial Championship Group B

References

External links
 

2015 rugby union tournaments for clubs
2015 in Namibian sport
2015 in South African rugby union
Vodacom Cup